Prodel may refer to:
 Prödel, former German municipality
 Dydrogesterone, by trade name Prodel